Paul Schmidhalter (1 December 1931 – 23 August 2005) was a Swiss politician.  He was a member of the National Council of Switzerland from 1983 to 1995 and served as the President of the National Council from 1992 to 1993. He was a member of the Christian Democratic People's Party of Switzerland.

Biography
Paul Schmidhalter was born in the town of Brig, Switzerland, now part of the municipality of Brig-Glis in the Canton of Valais, on 1 December 1931 to Leopold and Olga Schmidhalter.  After he finished high school, he studied engineering at ETH Zurich, the Swiss Federal Institute of Technology.  He operated his own civil engineering practice for a number of years.

In 1973, he was elected to the city council of Brig and the Grand Council of Valais.  He held his city council seat until 1983 and his deal in the Grand Council until 1985.  In 1983, he was elected to the National Council from Valais. In 1992, he was selected to the council presidency.  After his one-year term ended, he continued to serve for two more years.  He did not run for re-election in 2005.

Schmidhalter died on 23 August 2005 in the town of Montana, Switzerland from cancer.

References

External links

1931 births
2005 deaths
Members of the National Council (Switzerland)
Presidents of the National Council (Switzerland)
Christian Democratic People's Party of Switzerland
People from Brig District